Hugh Montgomery may refer to:

 Hugh Montgomery, 1st Viscount Montgomery (1560–1636), aristocrat and soldier, one of the "founding fathers" of the Ulster-Scots
 Hugh Montgomery, 2nd Viscount Montgomery (1597–1642)
 Hugh Montgomery (soldier) (1720-1779), landowner and soldier during the American Revolution in North Carolina 
 Hugh Montgomery (sea captain) (?–1780), American sea captain of Nancy at the Battle of Turtle Gut Inlet on June 29, 1776
 Hugh Montgomery (Northern Ireland politician) (1844–1924), member of the Senate of Northern Ireland
 Hugh Montgomery (Royal Marines officer) (1880–1920), cricketer and military officer killed on Bloody Sunday
 Hugh Montgomery (British Army soldier), soldier found guilty of manslaughter in the Boston Massacre
 Hugh Lowell Montgomery (born 1944), American mathematician
 Hugh Montgomery (physician), director of the UCL Institute for Human Health and Performance
 Hugh E. Montgomery, director of the Thomas Jefferson National Accelerator Facility
 Hugh John Montgomery (1878–1956), merchant fox farmer and provincial politician from Alberta, Canada
 Hugh Montgomery, 1st Earl of Mount Alexander (c. 1623–1663), Irish peer
 Hugh Montgomery, 4th Earl of Mount Alexander (1680–1745), Irish landowner and politician
 Hugh Montgomery (Canadian politician) (1858–?), Ontario farmer and political figure
 Hugh Montgomery (diplomat) (1923–2017), United States diplomat and intelligence agent
 Hugh Massingberd, also known as Hugh Montgomery-Massingberd (1946-2007), English journalist, genealogist and editor of Burke's Peerage

See also
 Hugh Montgomerie (disambiguation)
 Hugh of Montgomery, 2nd Earl of Shrewsbury (died 1098), Anglo-Norman aristocrat